The Miriam Hospital is a private, not-for-profit hospital at 164 Summit Avenue in Providence, in the U.S. state of Rhode Island. It is a major teaching affiliate of the Warren Alpert Medical School of Brown University.

History
In 1902, a handful of women began collecting coins to raise $1,000 for the down payment on "a place to care for the indigent sick of the Jewish faith."

Since then, extraordinary generosity has been the catalyst for The Miriam Hospital. To fulfill the women's dream, 450 people joined their cause. The women went door to door, raising $80,000 in just four weeks. Thanks to their efforts, the first Miriam Hospital opened in 1926 with 63 beds and 14 bassinets.

Remarkably, the community stepped forward again. Only a year later, another $82,000 was raised to help defray the "burdens of caring for charity patients."

These first fundraising efforts were only the beginning of a partnership between The Miriam Hospital and the community; a relationship that has endured for generations. When the need to expand beyond a small, neighborhood hospital became evident, friends who had been raising money for linens and surgical supplies came forward to launch a major building fund drive. Although the drive and search for a suitable building were interrupted by the war years, an incredible $1.3 million was eventually raised. The new 150-bed Miriam Hospital opened on Summit Avenue in 1952. It was a gift of the Jewish community to all the people of Rhode Island.

The Miriam Hospital is currently part of the Lifespan network and is affiliated with the medical school of Brown University. As of 2010 there are 2,410 employees, 906 affiliated physicians, and 247 licensed beds.

The Miriam Hospital Association was formed by Jewish women sharing a common goal: to alleviate suffering by providing hospital care for Jewish immigrants in surroundings where their language and customs were understood. In 1926, The Miriam Hospital received a charter from the Rhode Island state legislature. As the community grew, so did its need for health care services. The Miriam's transition from a 63-bed hospital on Parade Street to the 247-bed complex on Summit Avenue has been a response to these needs. The new Miriam Hospital was dedicated on April 24, 1966, “… to serve all the people of Rhode Island, regardless of race, creed, origin or economic means.”

Throughout the years, The Miriam Hospital Association, now known as The Miriam Hospital Women's Association, has played a major role in the development of the hospital, and continued fundraising, volunteer programs, networking resources, providing invaluable assistance to the hospital and the community. It may be the first and perhaps only hospital initially founded and funded by women (distinguished from other hospitals for the care of women, or, staffed primarily by women).  Currently, top staff are women, and it is affiliated with Brown University Medical School.

The hospital is the subject of a book with many photographs, documenting the founding of the Miriam Hospital.

In 2018, Miriam Hospital received a $2.5 million federal grant to partner with Project Weber/RENEW and the Rhode Island Public Health Institute to create Rhode Island's first substance use treatment program for gay and bisexual, Black and Latino men.

Treatment
The mission of The Miriam Hospital is to inspire one another to improve the health and spirit of the lives they touch.

See also
List of hospitals in Rhode Island

References

Sources
Brian C. Jones, "The Miriam Hospital, a gift to the city: the history of the Miriam Hospital, Providence, Rhode Island." (2011), Pub. Miriam Hospital, Providence, RI, #OCLC:772628321

External links
Official Website

Hospital buildings completed in 1926
Hospital buildings completed in 1952
Buildings and structures in Providence, Rhode Island
Jews and Judaism in Rhode Island
Brown University
Teaching hospitals in Rhode Island